Extreme sports competition at the 2014 Asian Beach Games was held in Phuket, Thailand from 17 to 20 November 2014 at the Saphan Hin Sports Center, Phuket.

Medalists

Aggressive inline

BMX freestyle

Skateboarding

Medal table

Results

Aggressive inline

Big air
20 November

Park
17–18 November

Park best trick
19 November

BMX freestyle

Big air
20 November

Flatland
18 November

Park
17–18 November

Park best trick
19 November

Skateboarding

Park
18–20 November

Park best trick
20 November

Game of SKATE

References 

Schedule and Results

External links 
 

2014 Asian Beach Games events